Layda Elena Sansores San Román (born August 7, 1945) is a Mexican politician affiliated with the National Regeneration Movement and current Governor of Campeche. She served as the mayor of Álvaro Obregón, one of the boroughs of Mexico City. She served as a senator of the LXII Legislature of the Mexican Congress representing Campeche. She also served as senator during the LVI and LVII legislatures and as deputy of the Chamber of Deputies during the LV, and LX legislatures.

References

1945 births
Living people
Politicians from Campeche City
Citizens' Movement (Mexico) politicians
Women members of the Senate of the Republic (Mexico)
Members of the Chamber of Deputies (Mexico)
Members of the Senate of the Republic (Mexico)
20th-century Mexican politicians
20th-century Mexican women politicians
21st-century Mexican politicians
21st-century Mexican women politicians
Women members of the Chamber of Deputies (Mexico)
National Autonomous University of Mexico alumni
University of Buenos Aires alumni
Governors of Campeche
Morena (political party) politicians